Professor Michael Newton Marsh, DM, DSc, DPhil, FRCP was a reader of medicine at Magdalen College, Oxford, and became an academic biomedical research physician in Manchester. 
He died on 12 July 2021.

Career
In 2006, Marsh received a Distinguished Investigator Award for his work on gluten intolerance (coeliac disease), and his classification of intestinal responses, which are now internationally adopted. Marsh has received two lifetime achievement awards.

While approaching retirement, Marsh received an Oxford degree in theology, subsequently returning to Magdalen to write a D.Phil thesis on neurophysiological and theological approaches to near-death and out-of-body experiential phenomenology. In later life, he was at Wolfson College and, in addition, a Fellow of the Oxford Centre for Christianity and Culture at Regent's Park College, University of Oxford.

References 

Living people
21st-century English medical doctors
Alumni of Magdalen College, Oxford
British medical researchers
Year of birth missing (living people)